Narine Dovlatyan (born 7 January 1991 in Malishka, Soviet Union) is an Armenian Jazz singer and actress. She studied at Yerevan Komitas State Conservatory, department of jazz-vocal.

Early life
Dovlatyan was born in Malishka, Armenia and moved to Yerevan at the age of nine in order to receive a musical education. She attended Yerevan Komitas State Conservatory. She participated in a series of concerts, both singing and dancing, after graduating from the school of continuing education Komitas State Conservatory in the jazz-vocal department.

Music career 
Narine appeared in Season 3 of Hay Superstar. She shared 9th-10th place with Diana Grigoryan.

In late 2010, Narine released her first music video called "Beautiful Sunday", a winter-themed song featured by Haik Solar & Arni Rock. She was nominated for 2010 Best New Artist for her song. She released another single, "Look into my eyes", in 2011. She sang this song at the 2011 Armenian National Music Awards (ANMA). Narine sang at the 2012 Armenian National Music Awards again the following year. She sang her single "At My Feet". Dovlatyan was also nominated for Best New Artist of 2012 and won.

Discography 
"Beautiful Sunday" - 2010
"Look into my eyes" - 2011
"At My Feet" - 2012

Filmography

References

External links 
 Facebook page

Living people
1991 births
People from Malishka
21st-century Armenian women singers
21st-century Armenian actresses
Hay Superstar participants